Arina Ayanovna  Sharapova  (born May 30, 1961) is a Russian TV presenter, journalist and head of the workshop of journalism of the Moscow Institute of Television and Radio Broadcasting  Ostankino.

In 1997 and 2002 she announced the results of the Russian jury's voting at the Eurovision Song Contest.

During the 2013 Moscow mayoral election she was a trustee of the candidate Sergei Sobyanin.

She is a member of the Public Council under the Ministry of Internal Affairs of the Russian Federation.

Son   Danila Sharapov (born June 7, 1981), media manager, TV producer.

References

External links
   Арина Аяновна Шарапова — Президент «Школы Искусств и медиатехнологий»
   Арина Шарапова: «Я в жизни не боюсь ничего!»

1961 births
Living people
Russian television presenters
Russian journalists
Russian women journalists
Moscow State University alumni
Russian women television presenters